This is a list of Swiss football transfers for the 2022 summer transfer window. Only transfers featuring Swiss Super League are listed.

Swiss Super League

Note: Flags indicate national team as has been defined under FIFA eligibility rules. Players may hold more than one non-FIFA nationality.

Zürich

In:

Out:

Basel

In:

Out:

Young Boys

In:

Out:

Lugano

In:

Out:

St. Gallen

In:

Out:

Servette

In:

Out:

Sion

In:

Out:

Grasshoppers

In:

Out:

Luzern

In:

Out:

Winterthur

In:

Out:

See also
 2022–23 Swiss Super League

References

External links
 Official site of the ÖFB
 Official site of the Swiss Super League

Switzerland
Transfers
2022